Walter Franz (8 April 1911, in Munich – 16 February 1992, in Münster) was a German theoretical physicist who independently discovered the Franz–Keldysh effect.

Franz was a student of Arnold Sommerfeld at the University of Munich.  He was granted his Ph.D. in 1934. In the preface to the book Optik, Sommerfeld cited him for  "the most recent and particularly lucid treatment" of the vectorial generalization of Huygens’ principle.

With Adolf Kratzer, another student of Sommerfeld, Franz co-authored the book Transzendente Funktionen. An academic descendant of Franz, Ludwig Tewordt, is cited as having received his Ph.D. at the Westfälische Wilhelms-Universität Münster, in 1953. The article in which Franz independently published the Franz–Keldysh effect was published in 1958.

Selected bibliography
 Adolf Kratzer and Walter Franz Transzendente Funktionen (Akadem. Verl.-Ges. Geest & Portig, 1960)
 W. Franz  Die Streuung von Strahlung am magnetischen Elektron, Annalen der Physik Vol. 425, Issue 8, 689-707 (1938)
 Walter Franz, Einfluß eines elektrischen Feldes auf eine optische Absorptionskante, Z. Naturforschung 13a 484-489 (1958)

Notes

20th-century German physicists
1911 births
1992 deaths
Academic staff of the University of Münster